The 2006 Polish Figure Skating Championships were held in two parts:
 Senior and junior competitions were held in Krynica between December 9 and 11, 2005.
 Novice and younger senior competitions were held in Oświęcim between March 17 and 19, 2006.

Senior results

Men

Ladies

Pairs

Ice dancing

Junior results

Men

Ladies

Pairs

Ice dancing

Synchronized

Novice results

Men

Judges were:
 Technical Controller: Ryszard Kiewrel
 Technical Specialist: Olga Pałasz
 Judge No. 1: Danuta Dubrowko
 Judge No. 2: Ewa Lachowicz
 Judge No. 3: Maria Olesińska
 Judge No. 4: Agata Stoczek
 Judge No. 5: Katarzyna Kiewrel

Ladies

Judges were:
 Referee: Jan Wikłacz
 Technical Controller: Magdalena Seredyńska
 Technical Specialist: Olga Pałasz
 Judge No. 1: Andrzej Józefowicz
 Judge No. 2: Ewa Lachowicz
 Judge No. 3: Małgorzata Kacperek
 Judge No. 4: Agata Stoczek
 Judge No. 5: Beata Dombkowska

Ice dancing

Judges were:
 Technical Controller: Małgorzata Sobków
 Technical Specialist: Marcin Kozubek
 Judge No. 1: Andrzej Józefowicz
 Judge No. 2: Tomasz Politański
 Judge No. 3: Danuta Dubrowko

External links
 Senior and junior results at the Polish Figure Skating Association
 Novice and younger senior results at the Polish Figure Skating Association

Polish Figure Skating Championships
2005 in figure skating
Polish Figure Skating Championships, 2006
Polish Figure Skating Championships, 2006